Uglovka is an urban locality (a work settlement) in Okulovsky District of Novgorod Oblast, Russia, located on the Moscow – Saint Petersburg Railway. Municipally, it is incorporated as Uglovskoye Urban Settlement in Okulovsky Municipal District, one of the three urban settlements in the district. Population:

History
The village of Ugol was first mentioned in a chronicle in 1495. The development of the area started in 1851 when Uglovka became a railway station on the Nikolayevskaya Railway which connected Moscow and Saint Petersburg. Uglovka developed first as a settlement serving the railway stations, and eventually the limestone extraction started. In the beginning of the 20th century, it was a part of Borovyonskaya Volost of Valdaysky Uyezd of Novgorod Governorate. In 1921, it was transferred to Shegrinskaya Volost of Borovichsky Uyezd.

On August 1, 1927, the uyezds were abolished, and Uglovsky District with the center in the railway station of Uglovka was established as part of Borovichi Okrug of Leningrad Oblast. On July 23, 1930 the okrugs were abolished, and the districts became directly subordinate to the oblast. On January 1, 1932, Uglovsky District was abolished and split between Borovichsky, Okulovsky, and Bologovsky Districts. Uglovka became a part of Okulovsky District. On July 5, 1944, Okulovsky District was transferred to newly established Novgorod Oblast and remained there ever since.

Urban-type settlement status was granted to Uglovka on November 9, 1938.

Economy

Industry
The economy of Uglovka is based on limestone extraction and processing.

Transportation

Uglovka has a station on the Moscow – Saint Petersburg Railway. This was the first long-distance railway constructed in Russia, opened in 1851. Another  railway line going east of Uglovka connects it to Borovichi.

There is a road connection to Okulovka, as well as local roads.

Culture and recreation

Uglovka contains two objects classified as cultural and historical heritage of local significance. One of them is the Church of the Nativity of Christ, and the other one is a grave of two soldiers fallen in the Second World War. Uglovka was never occupied by the German troops, but was close to the front line.

References

Notes

Sources

Urban-type settlements in Novgorod Oblast
Valdaysky Uyezd